Urothemis is a genus of dragonfly in the family Libellulidae. 
Species of Urothemis can be medium-sized dragonflies which occur from Africa, across Asia to Indonesia and Australia.

Species
The genus Urothemis includes the following species:

References

Libellulidae
Anisoptera genera
Odonata of Oceania
Odonata of Africa
Odonata of Asia
Taxa named by Friedrich Moritz Brauer
Taxonomy articles created by Polbot